Events in the year 1889 in India.

Incumbents
 Empress of India – Queen Victoria
 Viceroy of India – Henry Petty-Fitzmaurice, 5th Marquess of Lansdowne

Events
 National income - 4,769 million

Law
Code Of Criminal Procedure
Commissioners For Oaths Act (British statute)
Interpretation Act (British statute)

Births
 2 February – Rajkumari Amrit Kaur, freedom fighter, social activist and Health Minister (d.1964).
 1 April – Dr Keshav Baliram Hedgewar, founder of the Rastriya Swayamsevak Sangh (RSS) (f.1925), social reformer and political activist. 
 14 November – Jawaharlal Nehru, politician and 1st Prime Minister of India (d.1964).

Full date unknown
 Keshavrao Date, actor (d. 1971).
 Amar Nath Kak, lawyer and author (d. 1963).

Sports
Mohun Bagan A.C. is formed

References 

 
India
Years of the 19th century in India